Robert William Hanbury PC (24 February 1845 – 28 April 1903) was a British Conservative politician. He served as President of the Board of Agriculture from 1900 to 1903.

Background and education
Hanbury was the only son of Robert Hanbury, of Bodehall House, Tamworth, Staffordshire, and his wife Mary, daughter of Major T. B. Bamford, of Wilnecote Hall, Warwickshire. The Hanbury family were landowners but mainly derived their wealth from collieries. He was orphaned at an early age and was later educated at Rugby and Corpus Christi College, Oxford.

Political career
In 1872 he was elected to the House of Commons as one of two representatives for Tamworth, a seat he held until 1878, and then sat for Staffordshire North until 1880, when he lost his seat. He unsuccessfully contested Preston in 1882, but won the seat in 1885. During the Liberal stay in power from 1892 to 1895 Hanbury was a vigorous critic of William Ewart Gladstone's Second Home Rule Bill from a financial perspective. When the Conservatives came to power in 1895 under Lord Salisbury, he was appointed Financial Secretary to the Treasury and sworn of the Privy Council. After the 1900 general election he was promoted to President of the Board of Agriculture, with a seat in the cabinet, by Salisbury. He held this post until his death three years later, the last year under the premiership of Arthur Balfour.

In August 1901 he received the Freedom of the City of Glasgow for services rendered in connection with the effort to obtain a licence to establish a municipal telephone exchange. He was elected a Fellow of the Royal Statistical Society in November 1902.

Personal life
Hanbury married firstly Ismena Tindal, daughter of Thomas Morgan Gepp, in 1869. She died in 1871. He married secondly Ellen, only child of Knox Hamilton, in 1884. There were no children from the two marriages. He died suddenly from pneumonia in April 1903, aged 58. He was buried in the churchyard at his country seat of Ilam, near Ashbourne, Derbyshire. His widow later married Victor Bowring and assumed the surname of Bowring-Hanbury.

References

External links
 

1845 births
1903 deaths
Alumni of Corpus Christi College, Oxford
Conservative Party (UK) MPs for English constituencies
Members of the Privy Council of the United Kingdom
UK MPs 1868–1874
UK MPs 1874–1880
UK MPs 1885–1886
UK MPs 1886–1892
UK MPs 1892–1895
UK MPs 1895–1900
UK MPs 1900–1906